Colin McKenzie (12 December 1880 – 31 August 1930) was an Australian cricketer. He played 30 first-class cricket matches for Victoria between 1907 and 1913.

Playing against Western Australia in 1909-10, McKenzie scored 211, and with Bert Kortlang, who scored 197, added 358 for the second wicket, setting an Australian second-wicket record.

See also
 List of Victoria first-class cricketers

References

External links
 

1880 births
1930 deaths
Australian cricketers
Victoria cricketers